This is a history of the progression of the World Record for the Swimming event: the 200 Butterfly. It is a listing of the fastest-time-ever swum in the event, in both long course (50m) and short course (25m) swimming pool. These records are maintained/recognized by FINA, which oversees international competitive Aquatics.

The long course records are historically older than the short course records: the long course records go back to at least the 1950s, whereas the short course marks having only been recognized since the early 1990s.

Men

Long course

Short course

Women

Long course

Short course

All-time top 25

Men long course
Correct as of December 2022

Notes
Below is a list of other times equal or superior to 1:54.35:
Kristóf Milák also swam 1:50.73 (2019), 1:51.10 (2021), 1:51.25 (2021), 1:51.40 (2021), 1:52.01 (2022), 1:52.22 (2021), 1:52.39 (2022), 1:52.50 (2021), 1:52.71 (2018), 1:52.79 (2018), 1:52.96 (2019), 1:53.18 (2021), 1:53.19 (2019), 1:53.58 (2021), 1:53.64 (2019), 1:53.75 (2019), 1:53.79 (2017), 1:53.87 (2017), 1:53.88 (2022), 1:53.89 (2022), 1:53.94 (2018), 1:53.97 (2022), 1:54.10 (2022), 1:54.17 (2018), 1:54.19 (2019, 2019).
Michael Phelps also swam 1:52.03 (2008), 1:52.09 (2007), 1:52.20 (2008), 1:52.76 (2009), 1:52.94 (2015) 1:53.01 (2012), 1:53.31 (2008), 1:53.34 (2011), 1:53.36 (2016), 1:53.48 (2009), 1:53.65 (2012), 1:53.70 (2008, 2008), 1:53.71 (2007), 1:53.80 (2006), 1:53.93 (2003), 1:54.02 (2008), 1:54.04 (2004), 1:54.11 (2010), 1:54.12 (2016), 1:54.31 (2004), 1:54.32 (2006), 1:54.35 (2003, 2009).
László Cseh also swam 1:52.91 (2016), 1:53.48 (2015), 1:53.53 (2015), 1:53.71 (2015), 1:53.72 (2017), 1:54.08 (2017), 1:54.22 (2017), 1:54.29 (2016), 1:54.35 (2008).
Takeshi Matsuda also swam 1:53.21 (2012), 1:53.32 (2009), 1:53.35 (2009), 1:53.87 (2009), 1:54.01 (2011, 2012), 1:54.02 (2008, 2010), 1:54.12 (2011), 1:54.19 (2012), 1:54.25 (2012), 1:54.30 (2011).
Chad le Clos also swam 1:53.33 (2017), 1:53.68 (2015), 1:54.00 (2018), 1:54.06 (2016), 1:54.15 (2019), 1:54.18 (2015), 1:54.32 (2013).
Tomoru Honda also swam 1:53.53 (2022), 1:53.61 (2022), 1:53.63 (2023), 1:53.73 (2021), 1:53.87 (2022), 1:54.01 (2022), 1:54.04 (2022), 1:54.06 (2022), 1:54.28 (2022).
Tamás Kenderesi also swam 1:53.62 (2016), 1:53.96 (2016), 1:54.14 (2018), 1:54.33 (2017).
Masato Sakai also swam 1:53.71 (2017), 1:54.21 (2016), 1:54.24 (2015), 1:54.30 (2016).
Paweł Korzeniowski also swam 1:53.75 (2009), 1:54.30 (2009), 1:54.33 (2009).
Daiya Seto also swam 1:53.86 (2019), 1:54.03 (2017), 1:54.08 (2014), 1:54.14 (2016, 2016), 1:54.21 (2017), 1:54.28 (2017), 1:54.34 (2018).
Nao Horomura also swam 1:53.90 (2017).
Luca Urlando also swam 1:54.10 (2022), 1:54.35 (2019).
Kaio de Almeida also swam 1:54.27 (2009).
Noè Ponti also swam 1:54.29 (2022).
Léon Marchand also swam 1:54.32 (2022).
Trenton Julian also swam 1:54.34 (2022).
Moss Burmester also swam 1:54.35 (2008).

Men short course
Correct as of December 2022

Notes
Below is a list of other times equal or superior to 1:50.62:
Chad le Clos also swam 1:48.56 (2013), 1:48.57 (2020), 1:48.61 (2014), 1:48.67 (2017), 1:48.76 (2016), 1:48.88 (2014), 1:49.04 (2013), 1:49.07 (2013), 1:49.08 (2017), 1:49.10 (2016), 1:49.20 (2014), 1:49.25 (2017), 1:49.33 (2016), 1:49.59 (2017), 1:49.71 (2016), 1:49.73 (2014, 2014), 1:49.78 (2022), 1:49.82 (2016), 1:49.83 (2013), 1:49.84 (2021), 1:49.89 (2022), 1:49.90 (2013), 1:49.93 (2016), 1:49.95 (2016), 1:49.98 (2022), 1:50.15 (2011), 1:50.24 (2020), 1:50.28 (2017, 2020), 1:50.29 (2016, 2018), 1:50.32 (2021), 1:50.33 (2013), 1:50.35 (2016), 1:50.39 (2013), 1:50.48 (2020), 1:50.57 (2020).
Daiya Seto also swam 1:48.77 (2019), 1:48.92 (2014), 1:49.22 (2022), 1:49.41 (2021), 1:49.53 (2016), 1:49.68 (2014), 1:49.76 (2021), 1:49.84 (2016), 1:49.87 (2018), 1:49.88 (2018), 1:49.93 (2016), 1:49.97 (2016), 1:49.99 (2022), 1:50.19 (2017), 1:50.28 (2021), 1:50.33 (2017), 1:50.36 (2021).
Tom Shields also swam 1:49.02 (2020), 1:49.05 (2015), 1:49.26 (2017), 1:49.29 (2017), 1:49.50 (2016), 1:49.62 (2017), 1:49.78 (2020), 1:49.86 (2017), 1:50.08 (2014), 1:50.19 (2014), 1:50.24 (2021), 1:50.25 (2019), 1:50.28 (2020), 1:50.39 (2021), 1:50.43 (2020), 1:50.51 (2021), 1:50.55 (2020), 1:50.56 (2014), 1:50.60 (2017), 1:50.61 (2013).
Kaio de Almeida also swam 1:49.11 (2009).
Tomoru Honda also swam 1:49.24 (2022), 1:49.84 (2021).
Trenton Julian also swam 1:49.93 (2022), 1:50.01 (2021), 1:50.08 (2022), 1:50.32 (2021).
Kristóf Milák also swam 1:49.98 (2019).
Alberto Razzetti also swam 1:50.12 (2022), 1:50.24 (2021).
Kuan-Hung Wang also swam 1:50.14 (2020).
Paweł Korzeniowski also swam 1:50.43 (2013).
Teppei Morimoto also swam 1:50.44 (2021).
Nikolay Skvortsov also swam 1:50.53 (2009), 1:50.58 (2009), 1:50.60 (2008).
Hidemasa Sano also swam 1:50.58 (2011).

Women long course
Correct as of March 2023

Notes
Below is a list of other times equal or superior to 2:05.95:
Liu Zige also swam 2:03.90 (2009), 2:04.18 (2008), 2:04.40 (2011), 2:04.59 (2013), 2:04.78 (2013), 2:05.29 (2009), 2:05.90 (2011).
Katinka Hosszú also swam 2:04.28 (2009), 2:05.59 (2013).
Mary Descenza also swam 2:04.33 (2009), 2:04.41 (2009).
Jiao Liuyang also swam 2:04.44 (2011), 2:04.50 (2009), 2:04.54 (2013), 2:04.72 (2008), 2:04.96 (2009), 2:05.18 (2012), 2:05.22 (2009), 2:05.46 (2010), 2:05.55 (2011), 2:05.57 (2009), 2:05.61 (2010), 2:05.79 (2010), 2:05.87 (2013).
Mireia Belmonte also swam 2:04.79 (2014), 2:04.85 (2016), 2:05.25 (2012), 2:05.26 (2017), 2:05.86 (2015).
Jess Schipper also swam 2:04.87 (2009), 2:05.40 (2006), 2:05.50 (2009), 2:05.65 (2005), 2:05.93 (2009).
Zhang Yufei also swam 2:04.89 (2021), 2:05.44 (2021), 2:05.49 (2021), 2:05.70 (2020), 2:05.84 (2021).
Natsumi Hoshi also swam 2:05.20 (2016), 2:05.48 (2012), 2:05.56 (2015), 2:05.91 (2011).
Summer McIntosh also swam 2:05.20 (2022), 2:05.79 (2022), 2:05.81 (2022).
Franziska Hentke also swam 2:05.39 (2017), 2:05.77 (2016).
Madeline Groves also swam 2:05.41 (2015), 2:05.47 (2016), 2:05.66 (2016).
Aurore Mongel also swam 2:05.48 (2009).
Ellen Gandy also swam 2:05.59 (2011), 2:05.90 (2011), 2:05.95 (2012).
Otylia Jędrzejczak also swam 2:05.78 (2002).
Hali Flickinger also swam 2:05.85 (2021), 2:05.87 (2018), 2:05.90 (2022).
Kathleen Hersey also swam 2:05.90 (2012).

Women short course
Correct as of December 2022

Notes
Below is a list of other times equal or superior to 2:03.60:
Mireia Belmonte also swam 2:01.52 (2013), 2:03.02 (2017), 2:03.17 (2014), 2:031.31 (2013), 2:03.37 (2011), 2:03.39 (2014), 2:03.59 (2010).
Katinka Hosszú also swam 2:01.60 (2018), 2:02.15 (2016), 2:02.20 (2012), 2:02.21 (2013), 2:02.40 (2013), 2:02.42 (2014), 2:02.75 (2017), 2:02.86 (2018), 2:02.87 (2018), 2:02.88 (2018), 2:02.99 (2014), 2:03.01 (2018), 2:03.05 (2013), 2:03.14 (2014, 2018), 2:03.21 (2019), 2:03.26 (2013), 2:03.34 (2016), 2:03.36 (2013).
Zige Liu also swam 2:02.50 (2009).
Kelsi Dahlia also swam 2:02.89 (2016), 2:03.31 (2018), 2:03.33 (2018), 2:03.51 (2018).
Zhang Yufei also swam 2:03.09 (2018), 2:03.29 (2018), 2:03.33 (2018), 2:03.50 (2018).
Suzuka Hasegawa also swam 2:03.12 (2020), 2:03.38 (2020), 2:03.53 (2020).
Madeline Groves also swam 2:03.34 (2016).
Franziska Hentke also swam 2:03.43 (2017), 2:03.47 (2013).

References
  World Records: Men - 200M Butterfly – International Swimming Hall of Fame, archived July 16, 2010
  World Records: Women - 200M Butterfly – International Swimming Hall of Fame, archived July 16, 2010

Butterfly 200 metres
World record progression 200 metres butterfly